The women's 100 metre butterfly event at the 2012 Summer Olympics took place on 28–29 July at the London Aquatics Centre in London, United Kingdom.

U.S. swimmer Dana Vollmer demolished a new world record to clear a 56-second barrier and to claim the Olympic title in the event for the first time since Amy Van Dyken did so in 1996. She touched third at the initial length, but powered home with a back-half strategy on the final stretch to capture the gold in 55.98, the first sub-56 second time in the event's history, shaving 0.08 seconds off the previous record set by Sweden's Sarah Sjöström in a since-banned high-tech body suit from the 2009 World Championships. China's Lu Ying came from behind with the same tactic to grab a silver in 56.87, while Australia's Alicia Coutts nearly pulled from worst-to-podium effort after turning last at the 50-metre lap to put up a late resistant surge for the bronze in 56.94.

Sjostrom, the former world record holder, finished off the podium with a fourth-place time in 57.17, and was followed in fifth by Italy's Ilaria Bianchi at a lifetime best and national record of 57.27. Denmark's Jeanette Ottesen Gray paid for an aggressive strategy with an early lead on the first half, before fading to sixth in 57.35. Vollmer's teammate Claire Donahue (57.48) and Great Britain's Ellen Gandy (57.76) rounded out the field. For the first time in Olympic history, all eight finalists finished the race under a 58-second barrier.

Earlier in the prelims, Vollmer posted both a textile and an American best of 56.25 to lead all swimmers for the top seed, wiping out Inge de Bruijn's 2000 Olympic record by 36-hundredths of a second.

Notable swimmers missed the final roster including Singapore's Tao Li, who delivered a surprise fifth-place finish in Beijing four years earlier; Gandy's home teammate Francesca Halsall; Poland's four-time Olympian Otylia Jędrzejczak; Australia's defending bronze medalist Jessicah Schipper; and Netherlands' Inge Dekker, who later scratched the semifinals to focus on her 4×100 m freestyle relay duty.

Records
Prior to this competition, the existing world and Olympic records were as follows.

The following records were established during the competition:

Results

Heats

Semifinals

Semifinal 1

Semifinal 2

Final

References

External links
NBC Olympics Coverage

Women's 00100 metre butterfly
Women's 100 metre butterfly
2012 in women's swimming
Women's events at the 2012 Summer Olympics